Čemernica is a frequent South Slavic toponym. It may refer to:

 Čemernica, Croatia, a village in Croatia
 Gornja Čemernica, a village in Croatia near Topusko
 Donja Čemernica, a village in Croatia near Topusko
 Čemernica, Ilijaš, a village in Bosnia and Herzegovina
 Čemernica (Pale), a village in Bosnia and Herzegovina
 Čemernica (river), a river in Serbia, tributary of the West Morava
 Čemernica (Serbia), a mountain in Serbia
 Čemernica (Bosnia and Herzegovina), a mountain in Bosnia and Herzegovina